The Face Behind the Mask is a 1941 American film noir crime film directed by Robert Florey and starring Peter Lorre. The screenplay was adapted by Paul Jarrico, Arthur Levinson, and Allen Vincent from the play Interim, written by Thomas Edward O'Connell.

Plot
Janos Szabo (Peter Lorre) is a hopeful new Hungarian immigrant who, on his first day in New York City, is trapped in a hotel fire that leaves his face hideously scarred. He is refused employment due to his appearance and, though possessing tremendous skill as a watchmaker, is willing to do any work. In extreme poverty, and despite believing that dishonesty can never bring happiness, he resorts to safecracking to obtain food, medicine, and a warm bed for his only friend, Dinky (George E. Stone).  Eventually he becomes the leader of a gang of thieves and raises money to commission and wear a realistic latex mask of his own face.

Janos then falls in love with Helen (Evelyn Keyes), a blind woman who perceives only the good in him, and attempts to leave his life of crime behind him. Unfortunately, his gang come to believe that he has betrayed them to the police, and attempt to kill him by car bomb, an attempt on his life that he survives but which kills Helen. In retaliation, Janos disguises himself as the pilot of the private plane in which the gang plans to fly out of the country. He lands the plane in the Arizona desert and lets out the fuel, suicidally stranding both the gang and himself without food or water, dooming them all to a slow death. At the film's end, Janos's body and those of his enemies are discovered by the police.

Cast
 Peter Lorre as Janos "Johnny" Szabo
 Evelyn Keyes as Helen Williams
 Don Beddoe as Lt. Jim O'Hara
 George E. Stone as Dinky
 John Tyrrell as Watts
 Stanley Brown as Harry
 Cy Schindell as Benson (as Al Seymour)
 James Seay as Jeff Jeffries
 Warren Ashe as Johnson, Reporter
 Charles C. Wilson as Chief O'Brien (as Charles Wilson)
 George McKay as Terry Finnegan

Production
The Face Behind the Mask was directed by French-American director Robert Florey, and written by Paul Jarrico, and Allen Vincent. The film is based on the radio play The Interim by Thomas Edward O'Connell. Florey previously made contributions to Universal Studios' 1931 film Frankenstein before James Whale was brought on as director, and he had directed Murders in the Rue Morgue. The film's script was specifically written with Peter Lorre in mind for the film's lead role, with parallels to Lorre's own life, as co-writer Jarrico recalled "The script was 'tailored', as I recall, in a sense Lorre had already been cast." Lorre was cast in the film's lead role of Janos "Johnny" Szabo as the first of a two-picture deal that he was contracted to make for Columbia Pictures. Evelyn Keyes, who had starred in Victor Fleming's Gone with the Wind, was cast as Janos' love interest Helen Williams. Actors Don Beddoe, George E. Stone, John Tyrrell, and Cy Schindell were cast in secondary roles for the film. Tyrell and Schindell were both regulars at Columbia Pictures and were well-known for starring in the studio's Three Stooges short films.

Principal photography began on November 6, 1940, lasting for 20 days.

Release

Theatrical release
The Face Behind the Mask had its official premiere on January 16, 1941.

Reception

The Face Behind the Mask was poorly received during its initial release.  In its 1941 review of the film, The New York Times was critical of the film, writing "Despite a certain pretentiousness toward things psychological, The Face Behind the Mask may safely be set down as just another bald melodramatic exercise in which the talents of Peter Lorre again are stymied by hackneyed dialogue and conventional plot manipulations."

Later reviews of the film have been more positive. Blockbuster Inc.'s Guide to Movies and Videos rated the film three out of four stars, praising the film's direction, premise, and performances.
Leonard Maltin awarded the film three out of a possible four stars, calling the film "Extremely well done on slim budget". Dennis Schwartz from Ozus' World Movie Reviews gave the film a "B+" on an A+ to F scale, calling it "a horror story in that it offers a vision of the American Dream turning ugly and wrong." TV Guide rated the film two out of four stars, calling it "A stylish film about human suffering".

Citations

Sources

Books

Websites

External links
 
 
 
 
 
 Online article from Turner Classic Movies

1941 films
1941 crime drama films
1941 horror films
American black-and-white films
American films based on plays
American horror films
Columbia Pictures films
1940s English-language films
Films about immigration to the United States
Films directed by Robert Florey
Film noir
Films set in New York City
Films set in Arizona
Films shot in California
1940s American films